Amy Nauiokas is the founder and CEO of Anthemis Group, a digital financial services investment firm and the founder and CEO of Archer Gray, a media production company. She previously worked at Cantor Fitzgerald and Barclays Stockbrokers.

Wall Street career 
Nauiokas was a senior managing director at Cantor in September 2001 when terrorists attacked the World Trade Center, where the firm was based. The attacks claimed the lives of 658 Cantor employees, and CEO Howard Lutnick appointed Nauiokas to the role of corporate spokesperson. In 2004, she left the firm for Barclays Capital. At the time of her departure, she was Cantor's director of global marketing, investor relations, and human resources. At Barclays Capital, Nauiokas was the head of eCommerce. She remained in that position until 2006, when she became CEO of Barclays Stockbrokers.

Anthemis 
After leaving Barclays Stockbrokers in 2008, Nauiokas co-founded Nauiokas Park, a venture capital firm focused on disruptive financial technologies. The firm was sold to the Anthemis Group in fall 2010, Anthemis' investments included Betterment, Simple Bank (sold to BBVA for $117 million in 2014), Payoff, The Climate Corporation (sold to Monsanto for $930 million in 2013), and Fidor Bank (sold to BPCE for an undisclosed amount in 2016).

Archer Gray 
In 2009, Nauiokas began independently financing and producing movies and plays, such as Once (winner of eight Tony Awards) and The Inevitable Defeat of Mister and Pete. In 2011, Nauiokas started Archer Gray to invest in media startups and in the development of film, television, and plays. Archer Gray has produced six feature films and four Broadway plays and invested in ten companies.

Filmography 
 Greetings from Tim Buckley (2012)
 The Inevitable Defeat of Mister and Pete (2013)
 Ten Thousand Saints (2015)
 The Diary of a Teenage Girl (2015)
 Mr Holmes (2015)
 20th Century Women (2016)
 Can You Ever Forgive Me, (2018) directed by Marielle Heller and starring Melissa McCarthy.

Personal life 
Nauiokas graduated from Dickinson College in 1994 with a B.A. in International Studies. She received a master's degree in International Business from Columbia University. She is a trustee of Dickinson and a member of the New Markets Women's Advisory Board at Credit Suisse. In 2010, Nauiokas launched Bubble Foundation to offer exercise and nutrition programming to low-income children in New York City charter schools. It  later merged with Edible Schoolyard. Nauiokas is married to Barclays banker Harry Harrison and was previously wed to James Connolly, an artist and chef. Her family divides their time between New York City and Washington Depot, Connecticut, where they own an Equestrian Center.

References 

Living people
Dickinson College alumni
Columbia University alumni
Year of birth missing (living people)
Place of birth missing (living people)
Businesspeople from New York City
American women chief executives
American chief executives of financial services companies
21st-century American women